The Kögart (Köğart, كۅعارت, ; , Kyogart) is a right tributary of the Kara Darya in Kyrgyzstan. The river is formed at the south-west slope of Fergana Range. The river's length is 105 km, and its basin area is 1370 km2. The annual average flow rate is 18.1 m3/s with maximum flow of 58.8 m³/s in May and minimum flow of 5.43 m³/s in January. The river is used for irrigation. It flows into the Kara Darya near the town Suzak.

References 

Rivers of Kyrgyzstan
Tian Shan